Hensley Paulina (born 26 June 1993) is a Dutch sprinter. He competed in the 4 × 100 metres relay event at the 2015 World Championships in Beijing narrowly missing the final.

Competition record

1Did not finish in the final
2Disqualified in the final

Personal bests
Outdoor
100 metres – 10.26 (+1.4 m/s, Heusden-Zolder 2014)
200 metres – 21.41 (+0.7 m/s, George Town 2010)

Indoor
60 metres – 6.64 (Jablonec nad Nisou 2016)

References

External links
 

1993 births
Living people
Curaçao male sprinters
Dutch male sprinters
World Athletics Championships athletes for the Netherlands
People from Willemstad
Olympic athletes of the Netherlands
Athletes (track and field) at the 2016 Summer Olympics
Dutch Athletics Championships winners